"C'mon and Love Me" is a 1975 single by the American rock band Kiss. It was originally featured on the group's third album Dressed to Kill.

Background
Written by Paul Stanley in under an hour, the track also appears in a live version   on Alive!. Stanley was inspired by the Moody Blues song "Question" when composing the tune.

The lyrics are a playful narrative portraying a Don Juan who takes the unique tack of offering himself up to his romantic prey: "Baby, baby don't you hesitate/'Cause I just can't wait/Lady, won't you take me down to my knees/You can do what you please/C'mon and Love Me."

Reception
"C'mon and Love Me" underperformed on the singles listings and did not chart. Nevertheless, it became a favorite in concert and a regular part of Kiss' 1970s performances. It has retained a cult following among the ensemble's fans and was later covered by Skid Row (this rendition can be found on B-Side Ourselves).

Cash Box said that "with ingenious lyrics, written from the sleazier side of being a rock star, Paul Stanley has written a blazing, high-energy rocker that illustrates why this group enjoys the fanatic, dedicated coterie it does."

Appearances
The song has appeared on the following Kiss issues:

Dressed to Kill - original studio version
Alive! - live version
Kiss Unplugged longform video - live version
Kiss Alive 35 - live version
The Originals - studio version
Double Platinum - remixed studio version
The Box Set - Alive! version
The Very Best of Kiss - studio version
The Best of Kiss: The Millennium Collection - studio version
Gold - studio version
Kiss Chronicles: 3 Classic Albums - studio version
Kiss Alive! 1975–2000 - studio version
Ikons - studio version

"C'mon and Love Me" cover:
Heavy metal band Skid Row covered the song for their EP B-Side Ourselves

Personnel
Paul Stanley – lead vocals, rhythm guitar, intro guitar solo
Gene Simmons – bass, backing vocals
Peter Criss – drums, backing vocals
Ace Frehley – acoustic guitar, guitar solo

References

1975 singles
Casablanca Records singles
Kiss (band) songs
Songs written by Paul Stanley
1975 songs